Vaisey is a surname. Notable people with the surname include:

David Vaisey (born 1935), English librarian and historian
Harry Vaisey (1877–1965), English judge

See also
Vaisey, Sheriff of Nottingham, fictional character in the 2006 BBC television series Robin Hood
Feasey